Robert Thomson (born 11 March 1961) is an Australian journalist. Since January 2013 he has been chief executive of News Corp.

Life 
Thomson was born in Torrumbarry, Victoria, and studied at Christian Brothers College in St Kilda East, and at the Royal Melbourne Institute of Technology. One of his ancestors was named Arturo Dell'Oro, and came from Domodossola, in northern Italy. He is married to Wang Ping, the daughter of a general in the Chinese People's Liberation Army.

Career 
Thomson started work as a copyboy at The Herald (now the Herald Sun) in Melbourne in 1979. In 1983, he became senior feature writer for The Sydney Morning Herald, and two years later became Beijing correspondent for The Sydney Morning Herald as well as the Financial Times. Thomson then became a Tokyo correspondent for the Financial Times in 1989. Thomson was appointed the Financial Times foreign news editor in 1994 and in 1996 became editor of the Financial Times weekend edition. While at Sydney Morning Herald, Thomson wrote a series on Australian judges, which was published as a book in 1987, The Judges: A Portrait of an Australian Judiciary. In 1998, Thomson became U.S. managing editor of the Financial Times.

In May 2008, he was appointed managing editor of The Wall Street Journal, having previously been the editor of The Times.

He received an honorary doctorate from RMIT University in 2010.

In January 2013, Thomson became the chief executive of News Corp.

In 2007, Thomson was one of the first media executives to criticize Google and big tech for the disaggregation of content and publication of falsehoods, and to pressure them for a higher share of advertising value. He has been known to use alliterative expressions to call out those companies, such as platforms for "the fake, the faux and the fallacious," and "tech tapeworms." Thomson called for new terms of trade for tech platforms to allow viable business models for creators and to benefit broader society.

Notes

External links 

Robert Thomson lecture online: From the editorial desk of The Times, RMIT School of Applied Communication Public Lecture series



1961 births
Living people
Australian newspaper editors
British newspaper editors
The Times people
Journalists from Melbourne
RMIT University alumni
The Wall Street Journal people
The Herald (Melbourne) people
The Sydney Morning Herald people